Mahaakshay Chakraborty (born 30 July 1984), also known by the nickname Mimoh Chakraborty, is an Indian actor who works in Hindi film industry. He is the son of actors Mithun Chakraborty and Yogeeta Bali.

Early life
Mimoh was born on 30 July 1984 in Mumbai to actors Mithun Chakraborty and Yogeeta Bali. He has 2 brothers and a sister namely Ushmey Chakraborty, Namashi Chakraborty and Dishani Chakraborty.

Career
He debuted as "Mimoh" with a lead role in the 2008 film Jimmy, playing a DJ, who is falsely accused of murder, which leads him into the crime world. The film was directed by Raj N. Sippy and starred Rahul Dev, Shakti Kapoor and Vivana Singh in key roles. The film received only negative reviews from critics and audiences and it was declared a box-office bomb. Many viewers criticised acting skills of Mimoh. Film journalist Patchy N from Rediff.com wrote ‘‘In this day and age when debutants are well-groomed, trained in action, dance, and most importantly, dialogue, diction and acting, it's shocking that Mimoh Chakraborty looks so terribly unprepared’’.

His next two releases after Jimmy (2008) went unreleased namely He- The Only One (2010) and The Murderer- Hamilton Palace (2011). In the film He- The Only One, he was paired opposite Hansika Motwani.

In 2011, his first release was Haunted - 3D which was the first Indian stereo-scopic 3D horror film. The film received mixed reviews from critics and audiences and went onto become a commercial success. The Times of India while giving it three stars out of five stated "if the film works -- and it works quite well -- is only because of the special effects of the film. Experiencing the horror in 3D is indeed a novel experience for the viewer, specially since it is smartly done."

In his next release, Loot, he plays a 
boy-next-door, who has been taken to Pattaya to rob a house, although him and his crime-partners (Govinda, Suniel Shetty and Jaaved Jaffrey) end up looting the wrong house. Loot received mixed to negative reviews from most critics, and was a box office flop.

After Loot, he then starred in films like Rocky (2013), Enemmy (2013) and Ishqedarriyaan (2015). All three were critically and commercially failed at the box office. In 2021, he appeared in the biographical film Main Mulayam Singh Yadav. He portrayed the role of Shivpal Singh Yadav younger brother of Mulayam Singh Yadav.

He will be next seen in the thriller film titled Rosh which is directed by Jayeveer Panghaal and also stars Nikita Soni. He has also been roped in Nawazuddin Siddiqui starrer film Jogira Sara Ra Ra, directed by Kushan Nandy. The film also stars Sanjay Mishra and Neha Sharma in key roles.

Personal life
In 2010, Indian gossip columnist Vicky Lalwani linked Mimoh to actress Shama Sikander – a claim both parties denied. In July 2018, he married actress Madalsa Sharma Chakraborty.

Mahaakshay is an avid Battlefield and Call of Duty fan and regularly streams on Twitch under the alias meem0h.

Controversy
In October 2020, Mahaakshay and his mother Yogeeta Bali was booked in a rape case registered in Mumbai. A Bhojpuri actress accused Mimoh of rape on the pretext of marriage, and a FIR was registered at the Oshiwara Police Station in Mumbai. Yogeeta Bali was accused of threatening the victim and forcing her to settle the case.

Filmography

References

External links 
 
 
 

1984 births
Living people
Indian male film actors
Male actors in Hindi cinema
21st-century Indian male actors
Male actors in Bengali cinema
Male actors from Mumbai